Pachyloma may refer to:
 Pachyloma (plant), a genus of flowering plants in the family Melastomataceae
 Pachyloma, a genus of flowering plants in the family Ranunculaceae, synonym of Ranunculus
 Pachyloma, a genus of ferns in the family Hymenophyllaceae, synonym of Hymenophyllum